Tom Okker and Marty Riessen were the defending champions, but lost in the second round this year.

Ilie Năstase and Ion Ţiriac successfully defended their title, defeating Arthur Ashe and Dennis Ralston 6–4, 6–3 in the final.

Seeds

Draw

Finals

Top half

Bottom half

References
Draw

U.S. Pro Indoor
1970 Grand Prix (tennis)